Musically Yours is a solo album by American jazz pianist Horace Parlan featuring performances recorded in 1979 and released on the Danish-based SteepleChase label.  The album consists mainly of jazz standards and show tunes with one original by Parlan. The same sessions also produced Parlan's album The Maestro.

Reception
The Allmusic review by Scott Yanow awarded the album 3 stars stating "Parlan tends to sound at his best in a trio where he can draw inspiration from his sidemen, so this often-sparse set of unaccompanied piano solos, despite some good moments, is not his most essential outing".

Track listing
 "Alone Together" (Howard Dietz, Arthur Schwartz) - 6:14  
 "Memories of You" (Eubie Blake, Andy Razaf) - 6:16  
 "Musically Yours" (Horace Parlan) - 5:37  
 "Ill Wind" (Harold Arlen, Ted Koehler) - 7:03  
 "Lullaby of the Leaves" (Bernice Petkere, Joe Young) - 5:25  
 "Ruby, My Dear" (Thelonious Monk) - 5:47  
 "Jitterbug Waltz" (Fats Waller) - 6:27  
 "Nardis" (Miles Davis) - 5:49

Personnel
Horace Parlan - piano

References

1979 albums
Horace Parlan albums
Solo piano jazz albums
SteepleChase Records albums